USS Anguilla Bay may refer to the following ships operated by the United States Navy:

 , renamed Corregidor prior to launch
 , renamed Salamaua prior to launch

United States Navy ship names